The women's team pursuit competition at the 2022 European Speed Skating Championships was held on 9 January 2022.

Results
The race was started at 14:00.

References

Women's team pursuit